Sergey Smorodin (Uzbek Cyrillic: Сергей Смородин; born 15 February 1994) is an Uzbekistani footballer who plays as goalkeeper.

Career
Smorodin is a product of Pakhtakor Tashkent youth academy. He went on loan to FK Andijon and made his debut in the Uzbek League on 7 November 2014 in a match against FC Neftchi Fergana.

In February 2017 he signed a contract with the Ukrainian Premier League FC Chernomorets.

References

External links

Sergey Smorodin - Footballdatabase

1994 births
Living people
Uzbekistani footballers
FK Andijon players
FK Neftchi Farg'ona players
FC Chornomorets Odesa players
Club Green Streets players
Ukrainian Premier League players
Sportspeople from Tashkent
Uzbekistani expatriate footballers
Expatriate footballers in Ukraine
Expatriate footballers in the Maldives
Uzbekistani expatriate sportspeople in Ukraine
Uzbekistani expatriate sportspeople in the Maldives
Association football goalkeepers